Linum austriacum, Asian flax, is a species of flowering plant belonging to the family Linaceae.

Its native range is Eastern Central Europe to Western and Central Asia.

References

Linaceae